The Battle of Abomey (1892) was the climactic struggle in the Dahomey War between France and the Kingdom of Dahomey. French forces, commanded by Alfred-Amédée Dodds, were victorious over the Dahomey army. The triumph was pivotal to linking French possessions in upper Senegal with those in the upper Niger.

References

Abomey
Kingdom of Dahomey
1892 in France
1892 in Africa